Edler was until 1919 the lowest rank of nobility in Austria-Hungary and Germany, just beneath a Ritter (hereditary knight), but above untitled nobles, who used only the nobiliary particle von before their surname. It was mostly given to civil servants and military officers, as well as those upon whom the lower rank of an Order had been conferred. The noun Edler comes from the adjective edel ("noble"), and translated literally means "noble [person]". In accordance with the rules of German grammar, the word can also appear as Edle, Edlem, or Edlen depending on case, gender, and number.

Originally, from the Middle Ages, under the feudal system (in Europe and elsewhere), the nobility were generally those who held a fief, often in the form of heritable land worked by vassals. To preserve the feudal naming practice, even in cases where upper-ranking bureaucrats received patents of nobility for long service or merit, as in the 18th, 19th, and early 20th centuries (see noblesse de robe), the old practice of denoting a noble with a territorial designation was continued out of a sense of tradition.

Thus, landless nobles were created under the formula Edler von XYZ: either the surname or a place-name followed the German preposition von, which, in this context, was taken to denote nobility. The English translation of this is normally Noble of XYZ. Frequently, the nobiliary particle von (English 'of', or, more commonly, the French particule de noblesse 'de', meaning the same thing), was represented simply by the abbreviation v. to specify that it was being used to denote a member of the nobility, and not simply as the ordinary German-language preposition von. 

An example of such a person's name and title is Josef Draginda, Edler v. Draginda. His wife would have been, for example, Johanna Draginda, Edle v. Draginda. Another example is the Austro-Hungarian general Viktor Weber Edler von Webenau, who signed the Armistice of Villa Giusti between Austria-Hungary and the Entente at the end of World War I.

The wife and the daughters of an Edler were titled Edle.

In Czech this title is translated and used as šlechtic z.

Modern usage in German surnames and alphabetical sorting

The title Edler was banned in Austria with the abolition of Austrian nobility in 1919. In Germany, when the German nobility was stripped of its privileges under the Article 109 of Weimar Constitution in 1919, the title was transformed into a dependent part of the legal surname. 

Since that time, the terms Edle, Edler von etc. are not to be translated, as they have lost their title status. These terms now appear following the given name, e.g. Wolfgang Gans Edler Herr zu Putlitz. As dependent parts of the surnames (nichtselbständige Namensbestandteile), the terms Edle, Edler von etc. are ignored in alphabetical sorting of names, as is the eventual nobility particle, and might or might not be used by those bearing them. The unofficial titles do, however, retain prestige in some circles of society.

Notes

References 
 Meyers Enzyklopädisches Lexikon; Bibliographisches Institut, Lexikonverlag, Mannheim/Wien/Zürich 1975, Band 7, S. 420.

1919 disestablishments in Austria
1919 disestablishments in Germany

Austrian noble titles
German noble titles
Noblemen